National Route 673 (N673) forms a part of the Philippine highway network. It is one of the national secondary roads with two non-contiguous highways, one which runs through the municipality of Pili, Camarines Sur in the Bicol region of Luzon, while the other road runs within the city of Calbayog in the Samar region of Visayas.

Route description

Camarines Sur
In Pili, the province's municipality and provincial capital, N673 starts at the intersection of N1 (Maharlika Highway) on its northern terminus and ends at the intersection of N630 (Governor Jose Fuentebella National Highway) as its southern terminus.  The entire numbered route is known as Pili Diversion Road, where it bypasses the town proper which Maharlika Highway leads.

Samar
In Calbayog, N673 connects from N1 (Maharlika Highway) to Barangay Trinidad. The entire numbered route is known as Old Calbayog National Road, which parallels the runway of Calbayog Airport. After intersecting a narrow street in Barangay Trinidad, the road then continues south unnumbered up to Barangay Basud.

References

Roads in Camarines Sur
Roads in Samar (province)